The Red FM Tulu Film Awards is an award ceremony for Tulu films presented by Red FM 93.5 radio station. The awards have been instituted to honour both artistic and technical excellence in Tulu Cinema.

Awards List

Lifetime Achievement Award - K.N.Taylor
Best Film - Oriyardori Asal
Best Actor (Male) - Arjun Kapikad for Telikeda Bolli
Best Actor (Female) - Pakhi Hegde for Bangarda Kural
Best Director - H S Rajshekar for Oriyardori Asal
Best Actor in a Comic Role - Navin D Padil for Oriyardori Asal
Best Male Playback Singer - Udit Narayan for Oriyardori Asal
Best Female Playback Singer - Sangeeta Balachandra for Kadala Mage
Best Music Director - A K Vijay for Oriyardori Asal
Best Choreography - Madan Harini for Telikeda Bolli
Best Actor in a Negative Role - Gopinath Bhat for Telikeda Bolli
Best Supporting Actor - B S Boloor for Telikeda Bolli
Best Supporting Actress - Shakuntala Shetty for Kanchilda Bale
Best Child Artist Award - Baby Chitra for Kanchilda Bale
Best Lyricist - V.Manohar for Barke
Best Editor - Srinivas Babu for Oriyardori Asal
Best Cinema Developer Award - P L Ravi for Kanchilda Bale
Best Background Score - Sathish Babu for Oriyardori Asal
Best Art Direction - Tamma Lakshman for Kadala Mage
Best Action - Harish Shetty for Bangarda Kural
Best Dialogue - Devadas Kapikad for Telikeda Bolli
Best Screenplay - Ram Shetty for Bangarda Kural
Best Story - Sudhakar Bannanje for Dever

Special awards
'Gaggara'
Sadashiva Shetty
Bangar Patler
Nirel
Sarojini Shetty
Seetharam Kulal
Pradeep

See also 
List of Tulu films of 2015
List of Tulu films of 2014
List of Released Tulu films
Tulu Cinemotsava 2015

References

Awards established in 2014
Indian film awards
 
2014 establishments in Tamil Nadu